This is a list of newspapers in Fiji.

Daily Post
Fiji Focus
Fiji Live
Fiji Samachar
Fiji Sun
Fiji Village
The Jet Newspaper
Shanti Dut
The Stallion
South Sea Times
Nai Lalakai
Kaila
Fiji Newswire
Fiji One
Fiji Broadcasting Corporation
Islands Business (magazine)
Mai Life (magazine)

See also
List of newspapers

Fiji
Newspapers
Newspapers